Dextella is a genus of moths of the family Erebidae erected by Michael Fibiger in 2011.

Species
Dextella alleni Fibiger, 2011
Dextella khaoyaiana Fibiger, 2011
Dextella flavus Fibiger, 2011

References

Micronoctuini
Noctuoidea genera